Caruso Memorial Chapel is named in honor of Marine Sergeant Mathew Caruso, was dedicated by the United States Marine Corps in August 1953. Sergeant Caruso gave his life while protecting the life of his chaplain in action against the enemy.

In April 2012, volunteers from the Church of Jesus Christ of Latter-day Saints and Marines renovated the chapel.  The work included landscaping, painting the interior walls, repairing the screens of 15 windows, refurbishing and painting the framework of the entryway.  Donations from the Carlsbad, California business community helped purchase supplies.  On June 23, 2014, the chapel was rededicated to Sgt. Matthew Caruso, at the School of Infantry-West.  Caruso’s family and a congregation of more than 100 Marines, sailors and civilian friends attended.

Memorial Plaque 
The memorial plaque reads:
Caruso Memorial Chapel

To the Glory of Almighty God and the memory of Sgt. Mathew Caruso, U.S.M.C., Seventh Marines, 1st Marine Division, killed in action near Koto-Ri, Korea, 6 December 1950, the United States Marine Corps humbly dedicates this Chapel that his Spirit of Loyalty, Courage, and Devotion may serve to inspire all who enter here to pray. 'Greater love than this no man hath, that a man lay down his life for his friends' St. John, 15

See also

 Marine Corps Base Camp Pendleton
 United States Marine Corps

References

External links 
 Caruso Memorial Chapel Facebook Page
 Semper Fi Padre: The Mathew Caruso Story

Gallery

United States Marine Corps installations
Military chapels of the United States